Mikhail Kislyakov (born November 18, 1975, Krasnoe, Zapolyarny District) is a Russian political figure and deputy of the 8th State Duma.  

From 2003 to 2021, he was the Chairman of the Agricultural Production Cooperative "Fishing Collective Farm "Zapolyarye". From 2018 to 2021, he was the deputy of the Arkhangelsk Oblast Assembly of Deputies. Since September 2021, he has served as deputy of the 8th State Duma.

He is one of the members of the State Duma the United States Treasury sanctioned on 24 March 2022 in response to the 2022 Russian invasion of Ukraine.

References

1975 births
Living people
United Russia politicians
21st-century Russian politicians
Eighth convocation members of the State Duma (Russian Federation)
Russian individuals subject to the U.S. Department of the Treasury sanctions